Bullard is an unincorporated community in Twiggs County, in the U.S. state of Georgia. A variant name is "Bullards".

History
Located in Twiggs County, Bullard was originally a railroad station located about a mile east of the Ocmulgee River. It was named for the Daniel Bullard family. Daniel Bullard I was a wealthy landowner and businessman who owned land on the east bank of the Ocmulgee River. The present settlement is about -mile east of the station. A post office was in operation at Bullard from 1870 until 1923.

References

Unincorporated communities in Twiggs County, Georgia
Unincorporated communities in Georgia (U.S. state)